The Nelson's Monument is a commemorative column or tower built in memorial to Admiral Horatio Nelson, situated on the Denes, Great Yarmouth in the county of Norfolk, England. It was designated as a Grade I listed structure in 1953.

History
Designed by architect William Wilkins, it was raised in the period 1817–19 from money raised by a committee of local magnates.
The first custodian of the monument was former Able Seaman James Sharman, a member of the crew of HMS Victory from Norfolk and one of those who carried Nelson below decks after he was shot.

The monument, correctly called the Norfolk Naval Pillar, is in the style of a Doric column topped by six caryatid figures that support a statue of Britannia proudly standing atop a globe inscribed with the motto from Nelson's coat of arms Palmam Qui Meruit Ferat (translates to 'Let him who has merited it take the palm'), she holds an olive branch in her outstretched right hand, a trident in her left and looks inland – said to be towards Nelson's birthplace in Burnham Thorpe in Norfolk. The structure was completely restored in time for the bicentenary of the Battle of Trafalgar in 2005. In 2006 it was removed from English Heritage's Buildings At Risk register. In August 2006 it was rededicated. It currently stands, albeit separated in its own small railed plot, in an industrial estate.
The monument is open to the public on a limited basis.

In the late nineteenth century, the original synthetic Coade Stone caryatids were replaced with concrete replicas. The figure of Britannia and the six caryatids were replaced by a fibreglass copy in 1982.

Dedications

At the base inscriptions commemorate Nelson's four main victories over Britain's enemies the French and Spanish:

The Nile (Aboukir), 1, 2 August 1798, HMS Vanguard
Copenhagen, 1 April 1801, HMS Elephant
St Vincent, 14 February 1797, HMS Captain
Trafalgar, 21 October 1805, HMS Victory

On the top plinth are named four of the ships he sailed on for each battle.

On the western face - i.e. inland again - a Latin inscription reads: "This great man Norfolk boasts her own, not only as born there of a respectable family, and as there having received his early education, but her own also in talents, manners and mind."

Song and poem
There is a song called "Nelson's Monument" which refers to the monument.

The Irish poet George Croly wrote the poem 'Nelson's Pillar' about this monument. The poem was written on the beach at Great Yarmouth on a stormy evening, and was first published in 1818:

See also
Nelson Monument, Edinburgh
Nelson Monument, Liverpool
Nelson's Monument on Birchen Edge, in England's Peak District
Nelson's Column, London
Nelson's Pillar, Dublin

References

External links

Norfolk Coast
song

Columns related to the Napoleonic Wars
Monuments and memorials in Norfolk
Great Yarmouth
Monumental columns in England
Towers completed in 1819
Monuments and memorials to Horatio Nelson
Grade I listed buildings in Norfolk